Teracotona subapproximans is a moth in the  family Erebidae. It was described by Rothschild in 1933. It is found in Tanzania.

References
Citations

Sources
Natural History Museum Lepidoptera generic names catalog

Endemic fauna of Tanzania
Moths described in 1933
Spilosomina